Jehu Baker (November 4, 1822 – March 1, 1903) was a U.S. Representative from Illinois.

Born near Lexington, Kentucky, Baker moved with his father to Lebanon, Illinois, in 1829. He attended the common schools and McKendree University. He studied law and was admitted to the bar in 1846, entering private practice in Belleville, Illinois. He served as master in chancery of St. Clair County, Illinois from 1861-1865.

Baker was elected as a Republican to the Thirty-ninth and Fortieth Congresses (March 4, 1865 – March 3, 1869), defeating incumbent William R. Morrison. He served as chairman of the Committee on Expenditures in the Post Office Department (Thirty-ninth Congress), Committee on Education and Labor (Fortieth Congress). In 1876, he campaigned in Illinois for Rutherford B. Hayes, who rewarded him by appointing him as United States Minister to Venezuela (1878–1881 and 1882–1885).

Baker was elected also as a Republican to the Fiftieth Congress (March 4, 1887 – March 3, 1889). He was an unsuccessful candidate for reelection in 1888 to the Fifty-first Congress. He continued the practice of law.

He later switched parties and was elected as a Democrat to the Fifty-fifth Congress (March 4, 1897 – March 3, 1899). He declined to be a candidate for renomination in 1898 to the Fifty-sixth Congress. He resumed the practice of law. He died in Belleville on March 1, 1903, and was buried in Walnut Hill Cemetery.

References
 
 American National Biography, vol. 2, pp. 22–23.

1822 births
1903 deaths
Ambassadors of the United States to Venezuela
McKendree University alumni
19th-century American diplomats
People from Lebanon, Illinois
Democratic Party members of the United States House of Representatives from Illinois
Republican Party members of the United States House of Representatives from Illinois
19th-century American politicians
People from Belleville, Illinois